Hegglun is a surname. Notable people with the surname include:

Greg Hegglun (born 1984), New Zealand cricketer
Tristan Hegglun (1915–1983), New Zealand rower, rugby union player, and politician